Mount Sarawaget is the highest mountain in Morobe Province, Papua New Guinea. It lies in the Saruwaged Range and at  it is one of the highest mountains in the country. The name "Mount Bangeta" is sometimes used synonymously, but in other sources it is a distinct summit.

See also
 List of highest mountains of New Guinea
 List of Ultras of Oceania

References

External links

Bangeta